Llanishen Rugby Football Club is a Welsh rugby union team based in Llanishen on the outskirts of Cardiff. Today, Llanishen RFC plays in the Welsh Rugby Union, Division One  East League, having been promoted from the Division Three South East league in the 2011/12 season. Llanishen RFC is a feeder club for Cardiff Blues.

Club honours
WRU Division Three South East - 2011/12 Champions
Club Captains (1st XV)
Lee Swindlehurst (2016-2020)
Ross McKenzie (2020–21)

Committee
Club Chairman - Gary Phillips
Club Treasurer - John Andrews
Club Secretary - Mark Francis

References 

Welsh rugby union teams
Rugby clubs established in 1962
Sport in Cardiff
RFC